Karlheinz Stockhausen (22 August 1928 – 5 December 2007) was a German composer, widely acknowledged by critics as one of the most important but also controversial composers of the 20th and early 21st centuries. He is known for his groundbreaking work in electronic music, for introducing controlled chance (aleatory techniques) into serial composition, and for musical spatialization.

He was educated at the Hochschule für Musik Köln and the University of Cologne, later studying with Olivier Messiaen in Paris and with Werner Meyer-Eppler at the University of Bonn. One of the leading figures of the Darmstadt School, his compositions and theories were and remain widely influential, not only on composers of art music, but also on jazz and popular music. His works, composed over a period of nearly sixty years, eschew traditional forms. In addition to electronic music—both with and without live performers—they range from miniatures for musical boxes through works for solo instruments, songs, chamber music, choral and orchestral music, to a cycle of seven full-length operas. His theoretical and other writings comprise ten large volumes. He received numerous prizes and distinctions for his compositions, recordings, and for the scores produced by his publishing company.

His notable compositions include the series of nineteen Klavierstücke (Piano Pieces), Kontra-Punkte for ten instruments, the electronic/musique-concrète Gesang der Jünglinge, Gruppen for three orchestras, the percussion solo Zyklus, Kontakte, the cantata Momente, the live-electronic Mikrophonie I, Hymnen, Stimmung for six vocalists, Aus den sieben Tagen, Mantra for two pianos and electronics, Tierkreis, Inori for soloists and orchestra, and the gigantic opera cycle Licht.

He died of sudden heart failure at the age of 79, on 5 December 2007 at his home in Kürten, Germany.

Biography

Childhood
Stockhausen was born in Burg Mödrath, the "castle" of the village of Mödrath. The village, located near Kerpen in the Cologne region, was displaced in 1956 to make way for lignite strip mining, but the castle itself still stands. Despite its name, the building is more a manor house than a castle. Built in 1830 by a local businessman named Arend, it was called by locals Burg Mödrath. From 1925 to 1932 it was the maternity home of the Bergheim district, and after the war it served for a time as a shelter for war refugees. In 1950, the owners, the Düsseldorf chapter of the Knights of Malta, turned it into an orphanage, but it was subsequently returned to private ownership and became a private residence again. In 2017, an anonymous patron purchased the house and opened it in April 2017 as an exhibition space for modern art, with the first floor to be used as the permanent home of the museum of the WDR Electronic Music Studio, where Stockhausen had worked from 1953 until shortly before WDR closed the studio in 2000.

His father, Simon Stockhausen, was a schoolteacher, and his mother Gertrud (née Stupp) was the daughter of a prosperous family of farmers in Neurath in the Cologne Bight. A daughter, Katherina, was born the year after Karlheinz, and a second son, Hermann-Josef ("Hermännchen") followed in 1932. Gertrud played the piano and accompanied her own singing but, after three pregnancies in as many years, experienced a mental breakdown and was institutionalized in December 1932, followed a few months later by the death of her younger son, Hermann.

From the age of seven, Stockhausen lived in Altenberg, where he received his first piano lessons from the Protestant organist of the Altenberger Dom, Franz-Josef Kloth. In 1938 his father remarried. His new wife, Luzia, had been the family's housekeeper. The couple had two daughters. Because his relationship with his new stepmother was less than happy, in January 1942 Karlheinz became a boarder at the teachers' training college in Xanten, where he continued his piano training and also studied oboe and violin. In 1941 he learned that his mother had died, ostensibly from leukemia, although everyone at the same hospital had supposedly died of the same disease. It was generally understood that she had been a victim of the Nazi policy of killing "useless eaters". The official letter to the family falsely claimed she had died 16 June 1941, but recent research by Lisa Quernes, a student at the Landesmusikgymnasium in Montabaur, has determined that she was murdered in the gas chamber, along with 89 other people, at the Hadamar Killing Facility in Hesse-Nassau on 27 May 1941. Stockhausen dramatized his mother's death in hospital by lethal injection, in Act 1 scene 2 ("Mondeva") of the opera Donnerstag aus Licht.

In late 1944, Stockhausen was conscripted to serve as a stretcher bearer in Bedburg. In February 1945, he met his father for the last time in Altenberg. Simon, who was on leave from the front, told his son, "I'm not coming back. Look after things." By the end of the war, his father was regarded as missing in action, and may have been killed in Hungary. A comrade later reported to Karlheinz that he saw his father wounded in action. Fifty-five years after the fact, a journalist writing for The Guardian stated that Simon Stockhausen was killed in Hungary in 1945.

Education
From 1947 to 1951, Stockhausen studied music pedagogy and piano at the Hochschule für Musik Köln (Cologne Conservatory of Music) and musicology, philosophy, and German studies at the University of Cologne. He had training in harmony and counterpoint, the latter with Hermann Schroeder, but he did not develop a real interest in composition until 1950. He was admitted at the end of that year to the class of Swiss composer Frank Martin, who had just begun a seven-year tenure in Cologne. At the Darmstädter Ferienkurse in 1951, Stockhausen met Belgian composer Karel Goeyvaerts, who had just completed studies with Olivier Messiaen (analysis) and Darius Milhaud (composition) in Paris, and Stockhausen resolved to do likewise. He arrived in Paris on 8 January 1952 and began attending Messiaen's courses in aesthetics and analysis, as well as Milhaud's composition classes. He continued with Messiaen for a year, but he was disappointed with Milhaud and abandoned his lessons after a few weeks. In March 1953, he left Paris to take up a position as assistant to Herbert Eimert at the newly established Electronic Music Studio of Nordwestdeutscher Rundfunk (NWDR) (from 1 January 1955, Westdeutscher Rundfunk, or WDR) in Cologne. In 1963, he succeeded Eimert as director of the studio. From 1954 to 1956, he studied phonetics, acoustics, and information theory with Werner Meyer-Eppler at the University of Bonn. Together with Eimert, Stockhausen edited the journal Die Reihe from 1955 to 1962.

Career and adult life

Family and home

On 29 December 1951, in Hamburg, Stockhausen married Doris Andreae. Together they had four children: Suja (b. 1953), Christel (b. 1956), Markus (b. 1957), and Majella (b. 1961). They were divorced in 1965. On 3 April 1967, in San Francisco, he married Mary Bauermeister, with whom he had two children: Julika (b. 22 January 1966) and Simon (b. 1967). They were divorced in 1972.

Four of Stockhausen's children became professional musicians, and he composed some of his works specifically for them. A large number of pieces for the trumpet—from Sirius (1975–77) to the trumpet version of In Freundschaft (1997)—were composed for and premièred by his son Markus. Markus, at the age of 4 years, had performed the part of The Child in the Cologne première of Originale, alternating performances with his sister Christel. Klavierstück XII and Klavierstück XIII (and their versions as scenes from the operas Donnerstag aus Licht and Samstag aus Licht) were written for his daughter Majella, and were first performed by her at the ages of 16 and 20, respectively. The saxophone duet in the second act of Donnerstag aus Licht, and a number of synthesizer parts in the Licht operas, including Klavierstück XV ("Synthi-Fou") from Dienstag, were composed for his son Simon, who also assisted his father in the production of the electronic music from Freitag aus Licht. His daughter Christel is a flautist who performed and gave a course on interpretation of Tierkreis in 1977, later published as an article.

In 1961, Stockhausen acquired a parcel of land in the vicinity of Kürten, a village east of Cologne, near Bergisch Gladbach in the Bergisches Land. He had a house built there, which was designed to his specifications by the architect Erich Schneider-Wessling, and he resided there from its completion in the autumn of 1965.

Teaching

After lecturing at the Internationale Ferienkurse für Neue Musik at Darmstadt (first in 1953), Stockhausen gave lectures and concerts in Europe, North America, and Asia. He was guest professor of composition at the University of Pennsylvania in 1965 and at the University of California, Davis in 1966–67. He founded and directed the Cologne Courses for New Music from 1963 to 1968, and was appointed Professor of Composition at the Hochschule für Musik Köln in 1971, where he taught until 1977. In 1998, he founded the Stockhausen Courses, which are held annually in Kürten.

Publishing activities
From the mid-1950s onward, Stockhausen designed (and in some cases arranged to have printed) his own musical scores for his publisher, Universal Edition, which often involved unconventional devices. The score for his piece Refrain, for instance, includes a rotatable (refrain) on a transparent plastic strip. Early in the 1970s, he ended his agreement with Universal Edition and began publishing his own scores under the Stockhausen-Verlag imprint. This arrangement allowed him to extend his notational innovations (for example, dynamics in Weltparlament [the first scene of Mittwoch aus Licht] are coded in colour) and resulted in eight German Music Publishers Society Awards between 1992 (Luzifers Tanz) and 2005 (Hoch-Zeiten, from Sonntag aus Licht). The Momente score, published just before Stockhausen's death in 2007, won this prize for the ninth time.

In the early 1990s, Stockhausen reacquired the licenses to most of the recordings of his music he had made to that point, and started his own record company to make this music permanently available on Compact Disc.

Death

Stockhausen died of sudden heart failure on the morning of 5 December 2007 in Kürten, North Rhine-Westphalia. The night before, he had finished a recently commissioned work for performance by the Mozart Orchestra of Bologna. He was 79 years old.

Compositions

Stockhausen wrote 370 individual works. He often departs radically from musical tradition and his work is influenced by Olivier Messiaen, Edgard Varèse, and Anton Webern, as well as by film and by painters such as Piet Mondrian and Paul Klee.

1950s
Stockhausen began to compose in earnest only during his third year at the conservatory. His early student compositions remained out of the public eye until, in 1971, he published Chöre für Doris, Drei Lieder for alto voice and chamber orchestra, Choral for a cappella choir (all three from 1950), and a Sonatine for violin and piano (1951).

In August 1951, just after his first Darmstadt visit, Stockhausen began working with a form of athematic serial composition that rejected the twelve-tone technique of Schoenberg. He characterized many of these earliest compositions (together with the music of other, like-minded composers of the period) as punktuelle Musik, "punctual" or "pointist" music, commonly mistranslated as "pointillist", though one critic concluded after analysing several of these early works that Stockhausen "never really composed punctually". Compositions from this phase include Kreuzspiel (1951), the Klavierstücke I–IV (1952—the fourth of this first set of four Klavierstücke, titled Klavierstück IV, is specifically cited by Stockhausen as an example of "punctual music", and the first (unpublished) versions of Punkte and Kontra-Punkte (1952). However, several works from these same years show Stockhausen formulating his "first really ground-breaking contribution to the theory and, above all, practice of composition", that of "group composition", found in Stockhausen's works as early as 1952 and continuing throughout his compositional career. This principle was first publicly described by Stockhausen in a radio talk from December 1955, titled "Gruppenkomposition: Klavierstück I".

In December 1952, he composed a Konkrete Etüde, realized in Pierre Schaeffer's Paris musique concrète studio. In March 1953, he moved to the NWDR studio in Cologne and turned to electronic music with two Electronic Studies (1953 and 1954), and then introducing spatial placements of sound sources with his mixed concrète and electronic work Gesang der Jünglinge (1955–56). Experiences gained from the Studies made plain that it was an unacceptable oversimplification to regard timbres as stable entities. Reinforced by his studies with Meyer-Eppler, beginning in 1955, Stockhausen formulated new "statistical" criteria for composition, focussing attention on the aleatoric, directional tendencies of sound movement, "the change from one state to another, with or without returning motion, as opposed to a fixed state". Stockhausen later wrote, describing this period in his compositional work, "The first revolution occurred from 1952/53 as musique concrète, electronic tape music, and space music, entailing composition with transformers, generators, modulators, magnetophones, etc; the integration of  concrete and abstract (synthetic) sound possibilities (also all noises), and the controlled projection of sound in space". His position as "the leading German composer of his generation" was established with Gesang der Jünglinge and three concurrently composed pieces in different media: Zeitmaße for five woodwinds, Gruppen for three orchestras, and Klavierstück XI. The principles underlying the latter three compositions are presented in Stockhausen's best-known theoretical article, "... wie die Zeit vergeht ..." ("... How Time Passes ..."), first published in 1957 in vol. 3 of Die Reihe.

His work with electronic music and its utter fixity led him to explore modes of instrumental and vocal music in which performers' individual capabilities and the circumstances of a particular performance (e.g., hall acoustics) may determine certain aspects of a composition. He called this "variable form". In other cases, a work may be presented from a number of different perspectives. In Zyklus (1959), for example, he began using graphic notation for instrumental music. The score is written so that the performance can start on any page, and it may be read upside down, or from right to left, as the performer chooses. Still other works permit different routes through the constituent parts. Stockhausen called both of these possibilities "polyvalent form", which may be either open form (essentially incomplete, pointing beyond its frame), as with Klavierstück XI (1956), or "closed form" (complete and self-contained) as with Momente (1962–64/69).

In many of his works, elements are played off against one another, simultaneously and successively: in Kontra-Punkte ("Against Points", 1952–53), which, in its revised form became his official "opus 1", a process leading from an initial "point" texture of isolated notes toward a florid, ornamental ending is opposed by a tendency from diversity (six timbres, dynamics, and durations) toward uniformity (timbre of solo piano, a nearly constant soft dynamic, and fairly even durations). In Gruppen (1955–57), fanfares and passages of varying speed (superimposed durations based on the harmonic series) are occasionally flung between three full orchestras, giving the impression of movement in space.

In his Kontakte for electronic sounds (optionally with piano and percussion) (1958–60), he achieved for the first time an isomorphism of the four parameters of pitch, duration, dynamics, and timbre.

1960s
In 1960, Stockhausen returned to the composition of vocal music (for the first time since Gesang der Jünglinge) with Carré for four orchestras and four choirs. Two years later, he began an expansive cantata titled Momente (1962–64/69), for solo soprano, four choir groups and thirteen instrumentalists. In 1963, Stockhausen created Plus-Minus, "2 × 7 pages for realisation" containing basic note materials and a complex system of transformations to which those materials are to be subjected in order to produce an unlimited number of different compositions. Through the rest of the 1960s, he continued to explore such possibilities of "process composition" in works for live performance, such as Prozession (1967), Kurzwellen, and Spiral (both 1968), culminating in the verbally described "intuitive music" compositions of Aus den sieben Tagen (1968) and Für kommende Zeiten (1968–70). Some of his later works, such as Ylem (1972) and the first three parts of Herbstmusik (1974), also fall under this rubric. Several of these process compositions were featured in the all-day programmes presented at Expo 70, for which Stockhausen composed two more similar pieces, Pole for two players, and Expo for three. In other compositions, such as Stop for orchestra (1965), Adieu for wind quintet (1966), and the Dr. K Sextett, which was written in 1968–69 in honour of Alfred Kalmus of Universal Edition, he presented his performers with more restricted improvisational possibilities.

He pioneered live electronics in Mixtur (1964/67/2003) for orchestra and electronics, Mikrophonie I (1964) for tam-tam, two microphones, two filters with potentiometers (6 players), Mikrophonie II (1965) for choir, Hammond organ, and four ring modulators, and Solo for a melody instrument with feedback (1966). Improvisation also plays a part in all of these works, but especially in Solo. He also composed two electronic works for tape, Telemusik (1966) and Hymnen (1966–67). The latter also exists in a version with partially improvising soloists, and the third of its four "regions" in a version with orchestra. At this time, Stockhausen also began to incorporate pre-existent music from world traditions into his compositions. Telemusik was the first overt example of this trend.

In 1968, Stockhausen composed the vocal sextet Stimmung, for the Collegium Vocale Köln, an hour-long work based entirely on the overtones of a low B-flat. In the following year, he created Fresco for four orchestral groups, a Wandelmusik ("foyer music") composition. This was intended to be played for about five hours in the foyers and grounds of the Beethovenhalle auditorium complex in Bonn, before, after, and during a group of (in part simultaneous) concerts of his music in the auditoriums of the facility. The overall project was given the title Musik für die Beethovenhalle. This had precedents in two collective-composition seminar projects that Stockhausen gave at Darmstadt in 1967 and 1968: Ensemble and Musik für ein Haus, and would have successors in the "park music" composition for five spatially separated groups, Sternklang ("Star Sounds") of 1971, the orchestral work Trans, composed in the same year and the thirteen simultaneous "musical scenes for soloists and duets" titled Alphabet für Liège (1972).

Space music and Expo '70

Since the mid-1950s, Stockhausen had been developing concepts of spatialization in his works, not only in electronic music, such as the 5-channel Gesang der Jünglinge (1955–56) and Telemusik (1966), and 4-channel Kontakte (1958–60) and Hymnen (1966–67). Instrumental/vocal works like Gruppen for three orchestras (1955–57) and Carré for four orchestras and four choirs (1959–60) also exhibit this trait. In lectures such as "Music in Space" from 1958, he called for new kinds of concert halls to be built, "suited to the requirements of spatial music". His idea was  In 1968, the West German government invited Stockhausen to collaborate on the German Pavilion at the 1970 World Fair in Osaka and to create a joint multimedia project for it with artist Otto Piene. Other collaborators on the project included the pavilion's architect, Fritz Bornemann, Fritz Winckel, director of the Electronic Music Studio at the Technical University of Berlin, and engineer Max Mengeringhausen. The pavilion theme was "gardens of music", in keeping with which Bornemann intended "planting" the exhibition halls beneath a broad lawn, with a connected auditorium "sprouting" above ground. Initially, Bornemann conceived this auditorium in the form of an amphitheatre, with a central orchestra podium and surrounding audience space. In the summer of 1968, Stockhausen met with Bornemann and persuaded him to change this conception to a spherical space with the audience in the centre, surrounded by loudspeaker groups in seven rings at different "latitudes" around the interior walls of the sphere.

Although Stockhausen and Piene's planned multimedia project, titled Hinab-Hinauf, was developed in detail, the World Fair committee rejected their concept as too extravagant and instead asked Stockhausen to present daily five-hour programs of his music. Stockhausen's works were performed for 5½ hours every day over a period of 183 days to a total audience of about a million listeners. According to Stockhausen's biographer, Michael Kurtz, "Many visitors felt the spherical auditorium to be an oasis of calm amidst the general hubbub, and after a while it became one of the main attractions of Expo 1970".

1970s

Beginning with Mantra for two pianos and electronics (1970), Stockhausen turned to formula composition, a technique which involves the projection and multiplication of a single, double, or triple melodic-line formula. Sometimes, as in Mantra and the large orchestral composition with mime soloists, Inori, the simple formula is stated at the outset as an introduction. He continued to use this technique (e.g., in the two related solo-clarinet pieces, Harlekin [Harlequin] and Der kleine Harlekin [The Little Harlequin] of 1975, and the orchestral Jubiläum [Jubilee] of 1977) through the completion of the opera-cycle Licht in 2003. Some works from the 1970s did not employ formula technique—e.g., the vocal duet "Am Himmel wandre ich" (In the Sky I am Walking, one of the 13 components of the multimedia Alphabet für Liège, 1972, which Stockhausen developed in conversation with the British biophysicist and lecturer on mystical aspects of sound vibration Jill Purce), "Laub und Regen" (Leaves and Rain, from the theatre piece Herbstmusik (1974), the unaccompanied-clarinet composition Amour, and the choral opera Atmen gibt das Leben (Breathing Gives Life, 1974/77)—but nevertheless share its simpler, melodically oriented style. Two such pieces, Tierkreis ("Zodiac", 1974–75) and In Freundschaft (In Friendship, 1977, a solo piece with versions for virtually every orchestral instrument), have become Stockhausen's most widely performed and recorded compositions.

This dramatic simplification of style provided a model for a new generation of German composers, loosely associated under the label neue Einfachheit or New Simplicity. The best-known of these composers is Wolfgang Rihm, who studied with Stockhausen in 1972–73. His orchestral composition Sub-Kontur (1974–75) quotes the formula of Stockhausen's Inori (1973–74), and he has also acknowledged the influence of Momente on this work.

Other large works by Stockhausen from this decade include the orchestral Trans (1971) and two music-theatre compositions utilizing the Tierkreis melodies: Musik im Bauch ("Music in the Belly") for six percussionists (1975), and the science-fiction "opera" Sirius (1975–77) for eight-channel electronic music with soprano, bass, trumpet, and bass clarinet, which has four different versions for the four seasons, each lasting over an hour and a half.

1977–2003

Between 1977 and 2003, Stockhausen composed seven operas in a cycle titled Licht: Die sieben Tage der Woche ("Light: The Seven Days of the Week"). The Licht cycle deals with the traits associated in various historical traditions with each weekday (Monday = birth and fertility, Tuesday = conflict and war, Wednesday = reconciliation and cooperation, Thursday = traveling and learning, etc.) and with the relationships between three archetypal characters: Michael, Lucifer, and Eve. Each of these characters dominates one of the operas (Donnerstag [Thursday], Samstag [Saturday], and Montag [Monday], respectively), the three possible pairings are foregrounded in three others, and the equal combination of all three is featured in Mittwoch (Wednesday).

Stockhausen's conception of opera was based significantly on ceremony and ritual, with influence from the Japanese Noh theatre, as well as Judeo-Christian and Vedic traditions. In 1968, at the time of the composition of Aus den sieben Tagen, Stockhausen had read a biography by Satprem about the Bengali guru Sri Aurobindo, and subsequently he also read many of the published writings by Aurobindo himself. The title of Licht owes something to Aurobindo's theory of "Agni" (the Hindu and Vedic fire deity), developed from two basic premises of nuclear physics; Stockhausen's definition of a formula and, especially, his conception of the Licht superformula, also owes a great deal to Sri Aurobindo's category of the "supramental". Similarly, his approach to voice and text sometimes departed from traditional usage: Characters were as likely to be portrayed by instrumentalists or dancers as by singers, and a few parts of Licht (e.g., Luzifers Traum from Samstag, Welt-Parlament from Mittwoch, Lichter-Wasser and Hoch-Zeiten from Sonntag) use written or improvised texts in simulated or invented languages.

The seven operas were not composed in "weekday order" but rather starting (apart from Jahreslauf in 1977, which became the first act of Dienstag) with the "solo" operas and working toward the more complex ones: Donnerstag (1978–80), Samstag (1981–83), Montag (1984–88), Dienstag (1977/1987–91), Freitag (1991–94), Mittwoch (1995–97), and finally Sonntag (1998–2003).

Stockhausen had dreams of flying throughout his life, and these dreams are reflected in the Helikopter-Streichquartett (the third scene of Mittwoch aus Licht), completed in 1993. In it, the four members of a string quartet perform in four helicopters flying independent flight paths over the countryside near the concert hall. The sounds they play are mixed together with the sounds of the helicopters and played through speakers to the audience in the hall. Videos of the performers are also transmitted back to the concert hall. The performers are synchronized with the aid of a click track, transmitted to them and heard over headphones.

The first performance of the piece took place in Amsterdam on 26 June 1995, as part of the Holland Festival. Despite its extremely unusual nature, the piece has been given several performances, including one on 22 August 2003 as part of the Salzburg Festival to open the Hangar-7 venue, and the German première on 17 June 2007 in Braunschweig as part of the Stadt der Wissenschaft 2007 Festival. The work has also been recorded by the Arditti Quartet.

In 1999 he was invited by Walter Fink to be the ninth composer featured in the annual Komponistenporträt of the Rheingau Musik Festival.

In 1999, BBC producer Rodney Wilson asked Stockhausen to collaborate with Stephen and Timothy Quay on a film for the fourth series of Sound on Film International. Although Stockhausen's music had been used for films previously (most notably, parts of Hymnen in Nicolas Roeg's Walkabout in 1971), this was the first time he had been asked to provide music specially for the purpose. He adapted 21 minutes of material taken from his electronic music for Freitag aus Licht, calling the result Zwei Paare (Two Couples), and the Brothers Quay created their animated film, which they titled In Absentia, based only on their reactions to the music and the simple suggestion that a window might be an idea to use. When, at a preview screening, Stockhausen saw the film, which shows a madwoman writing letters from a bleak asylum cell, he was moved to tears. The Brothers Quay were astonished to learn that his mother had been "imprisoned by the Nazis in an asylum, where she later died. ... This was a very moving moment for us as well, especially because we had made the film without knowing any of this".

2003–2007

After completing Licht, Stockhausen embarked on a new cycle of compositions based on the hours of the day, Klang ("Sound"). Twenty-one of these pieces were completed before Stockhausen's death. The first four works from this cycle are First Hour: Himmelfahrt (Ascension), for organ or synthesizer, soprano and tenor (2004–2005); Second Hour: Freude (Joy) for two harps (2005); Third Hour: Natürliche Dauern (Natural Durations) for piano (2005–2006); and Fourth Hour: Himmels-Tür (Heaven's Door) for a percussionist and a little girl (2005). The Fifth Hour, Harmonien (Harmonies), is a solo in three versions for flute, bass clarinet, and trumpet (2006). The Sixth through Twelfth hours are chamber-music works based on the material from the Fifth Hour. The Thirteenth Hour, Cosmic Pulses, is an electronic work made by superimposing 24 layers of sound, each having its own spatial motion, among eight loudspeakers placed around the concert hall. Hours 14 through 21 are solo pieces for bass voice, baritone voice, basset-horn, horn, tenor voice, soprano voice, soprano saxophone, and flute, respectively, each with electronic accompaniment of a different set of three layers from Cosmic Pulses. The twenty-one completed pieces were first performed together as a cycle at the Festival MusikTriennale Köln on 8–9 May 2010, in 176 individual concerts.

Theories

In the 1950s and early 1960s, Stockhausen published a series of articles that established his importance in the area of music theory. Although these include analyses of music by Mozart, Debussy, Bartók, Stravinsky, Goeyvaerts, Boulez, Nono, Johannes Fritsch, Michael von Biel, and, especially, Webern, the items on compositional theory directly related to his own work are regarded as the most important generally. "Indeed, the Texte come closer than anything else currently available to providing a general compositional theory for the postwar period". His most celebrated article is "... wie die Zeit vergeht ..." ("... How Time Passes ..."), first published in the third volume of Die Reihe (1957). In it, he expounds a number of temporal conceptions underlying his instrumental compositions Zeitmaße, Gruppen, and Klavierstück XI. In particular, this article develops (1) a scale of twelve tempos analogous to the chromatic pitch scale, (2) a technique of building progressively smaller, integral subdivisions over a basic (fundamental) duration, analogous to the overtone series, (3) musical application of the concept of the partial field (time fields and field sizes) in both successive and simultaneous proportions, (4) methods of projecting large-scale form from a series of proportions, (5) the concept of "statistical" composition, (6) the concept of "action duration" and the associated "variable form", and (7) the notion of the "directionless temporal field" and with it, "polyvalent form".

Other important articles from this period include "Elektronische und Instrumentale Musik" ("Electronic and Instrumental Music", 1958), "Musik im Raum" ("Music in Space", 1958), "Musik und Graphik" ("Music and Graphics", 1959), "Momentform" (1960), "Die Einheit der musikalischen Zeit" ("The Unity of Musical Time", 1961), and "Erfindung und Entdeckung" ("Invention and Discovery", 1961), the last summing up the ideas developed up to 1961. Taken together, these temporal theories suggested that the entire compositional structure could be conceived as "timbre": since "the different experienced components such as colour, harmony and melody, meter and rhythm, dynamics, and form correspond to the different segmental ranges of this unified time", the total musical result at any given compositional level is simply the "spectrum" of a more basic duration—i.e., its "timbre", perceived as the overall effect of the overtone structure of that duration, now taken to include not only the "rhythmic" subdivisions of the duration but also their relative "dynamic" strength, "envelope", etc.
...
Compositionally considered, this produced a change of focus from the individual tone to a whole complex of tones related to one another by virtue of their relation to a "fundamental"—a change that was probably the most important compositional development of the latter part of the 1950s, not only for Stockhausen's music but for "advanced" music in general. Some of these ideas, considered from a purely theoretical point of view (divorced from their context as explanations of particular compositions) drew significant critical fire. For this reason, Stockhausen ceased publishing such articles for a number of years, as he felt that "many useless polemics" about these texts had arisen, and he preferred to concentrate his attention on composing.

Through the 1960s, although he taught and lectured publicly, Stockhausen published little of an analytical or theoretical nature. Only in 1970 did he again begin publishing theoretical articles, with "Kriterien", the abstract for his six seminar lectures for the Darmstädter Ferienkurse. The seminars themselves, covering seven topics ("Micro- and Macro-Continuum", "Collage and Metacollage", "Expansion of the Scale of Tempos", "Feedback", "Spectral Harmony—Formant Modulation", "Expansion of Dynamics—A Principle of Mikrophonie I", and "Space Music—Spatial Forming and Notation") were published only posthumously.

His collected writings were published in Texte zur Musik, including his compositional theories and analyses on music as a general phenomenon.

Reception

Musical influence
Stockhausen has been described as "one of the great visionaries of 20th-century music". His two early Electronic Studies (especially the second) had a powerful influence on the subsequent development of electronic music in the 1950s and 1960s, particularly in the work of the Italian Franco Evangelisti and the Poles Andrzej Dobrowolski and Włodzimierz Kotoński. The influence of his Kontra-Punkte, Zeitmasse and Gruppen may be seen in the work of many composers, including Igor Stravinsky's Threni (1957–58) and Movements for piano and orchestra (1958–59) and other works up to the Variations: Aldous Huxley in Memoriam (1963–64), whose rhythms "are likely to have been inspired, at least in part, by certain passages from Stockhausen's Gruppen". Though music of Stockhausen's generation may seem an unlikely influence, Stravinsky said in a 1957 conversation: I have all around me the spectacle of composers who, after their generation has had its decade of influence and fashion, seal themselves off from further development and from the next generation (as I say this, exceptions come to mind, Krenek, for instance). Of course, it requires greater effort to learn from one's juniors, and their manners are not invariably good. But when you are seventy-five and your generation has overlapped with four younger ones, it behooves you not to decide in advance "how far composers can go", but to try to discover whatever new thing it is makes the new generation new.

Amongst British composers, Sir Harrison Birtwistle readily acknowledges the influence of Stockhausen's Zeitmaße (especially on his two wind quintets, Refrains and Choruses and Five Distances) and Gruppen on his work more generally. Brian Ferneyhough says that, although the "technical and speculative innovations" of Klavierstücke I–IV, Kreuzspiel and Kontra-Punkte escaped him on first encounter, they nevertheless produced a "sharp emotion, the result of a beneficial shock engendered by their boldness" and provided "an important source of motivation (rather than of imitation) for my own investigations". While still in school, he became fascinated upon hearing the British première of Gruppen, and listened many times to the recording of this performance, while trying to penetrate its secrets—how it always seemed to be about to explode, but managed nevertheless to escape unscathed in its core—but scarcely managed to grasp it. Retrospectively, it is clear that from this confusion was born my interest for the formal questions which remain until today. Although it eventually evolved in a direction of its own, Ferneyhough's 1967 wind sextet, Prometheus, began as a wind quintet with cor anglais, stemming directly from an encounter with Stockhausen's Zeitmaße. With respect to Stockhausen's later work, he said, I have never subscribed (whatever the inevitable personal distance) to the thesis according to which the many transformations of vocabulary characterizing Stockhausen's development are the obvious sign of his inability to carry out the early vision of strict order that he had in his youth. On the contrary, it seems to me that the constant reconsideration of his premises has led to the maintenance of a remarkably tough thread of historical consciousness which will become clearer with time. ... I doubt that there has been a single composer of the intervening generation who, even if for a short time, did not see the world of music differently thanks to the work of Stockhausen. In a short essay describing Stockhausen's influence on his own work, Richard Barrett concludes that "Stockhausen remains the composer whose next work I look forward most to hearing, apart from myself of course" and names as works that have had particular impact on his musical thinking Mantra, Gruppen, Carré, Klavierstück X, Inori, and Jubiläum.

French composer and conductor Pierre Boulez once declared, "Stockhausen is the greatest living composer, and the only one whom I recognize as my peer". Boulez also acknowledged the influence of performing Stockhausen's Zeitmaße on his subsequent development as a conductor. Another French composer, Jean-Claude Éloy, regards Stockhausen as the most important composer of the second half of the 20th century, and cites virtually "all his catalog of works" as "a powerful discoveration , and a true revelation".

Dutch composer Louis Andriessen acknowledged the influence of Stockhausen's Momente in his pivotal work Contra tempus of 1968. German composer Wolfgang Rihm, who studied with Stockhausen, was influenced by Momente, Hymnen, and Inori.

At the Cologne ISCM Festival in 1960, the Danish composer Per Nørgård heard Stockhausen's Kontakte as well as pieces by Kagel, Boulez, and Berio. He was profoundly affected by what he heard and his music suddenly changed into "a far more discontinuous and disjunct style, involving elements of strict organization in all parameters, some degree of aleatoricism and controlled improvisation, together with an interest in collage from other musics".

Jazz musicians such as Miles Davis, Charles Mingus, Herbie Hancock, Yusef Lateef, and Anthony Braxton cite Stockhausen as an influence.

Stockhausen was influential within pop and rock music as well. Frank Zappa acknowledges Stockhausen in the liner notes of Freak Out!, his 1966 debut with The Mothers of Invention. On the back of The Who's second LP released in the US, "Happy Jack", their primary composer and guitarist Pete Townshend, is said to have "an interest in Stockhausen". Rick Wright and Roger Waters of Pink Floyd also acknowledge Stockhausen as an influence. San Francisco psychedelic groups Jefferson Airplane and the Grateful Dead are said to have done the same; Stockhausen said that the Grateful Dead were "well orientated toward new music". Founding members of Cologne-based experimental band Can, Irmin Schmidt and Holger Czukay, both studied with Stockhausen at the Cologne Courses for New Music. German electronic pioneers Kraftwerk also say they studied with Stockhausen, and Icelandic vocalist Björk has acknowledged Stockhausen's influence.

Wider cultural renown 
Stockhausen, along with John Cage, is one of the few avant-garde composers to have succeeded in penetrating the popular consciousness. The Beatles included his face on the cover of Sgt. Pepper's Lonely Hearts Club Band. This reflects his influence on the band's own avant-garde experiments as well as the general fame and notoriety he had achieved by that time (1967). In particular, "A Day in the Life" (1967) and "Revolution 9" (1968) were influenced by Stockhausen's electronic music. Stockhausen's name, and the perceived strangeness and supposed unlistenability of his music, was even a punchline in cartoons, as documented on a page on the official Stockhausen website (Stockhausen Cartoons). Perhaps the most caustic remark about Stockhausen was attributed to Sir Thomas Beecham. Asked "Have you heard any Stockhausen?", he is alleged to have replied, "No, but I believe I have trodden in some".

Stockhausen's fame is also reflected in works of literature. For example, he is mentioned in Philip K. Dick's 1974 novel Flow My Tears, the Policeman Said, and in Thomas Pynchon's 1966 novel The Crying of Lot 49. The Pynchon novel features "The Scope", a bar with "a strict electronic music policy". Protagonist Oedipa Maas asks "a hip graybeard" about a "sudden chorus of whoops and yibbles" coming out of "a kind of jukebox." He replies, "That's by Stockhausen ... the early crowd tends to dig your Radio Cologne sound. Later on we really swing".

The French writer Michel Butor acknowledges that Stockhausen's music "taught me a lot", mentioning in particular the electronic works Gesang der Jünglinge and Hymnen.

Later in his life, Stockhausen was portrayed by at least one journalist, John O'Mahony of the Guardian newspaper, as an eccentric, for example being alleged to live an effectively polygamous lifestyle with two women, to whom O'Mahony referred as his "wives", while at the same time stating he was not married to either of them. In the same article, O'Mahony says Stockhausen said he was born on a planet orbiting the star Sirius. In the German newspaper Die Zeit, Stockhausen stated that he was educated at Sirius (see Sirius star system below).

In 1995, BBC Radio 3 sent Stockhausen a package of recordings from contemporary techno and ambient music artists Aphex Twin, Richie Hawtin (Plastikman), Scanner and Daniel Pemberton, and asked him for his opinion on the music. In August of that year, Radio 3 reporter Dick Witts interviewed Stockhausen about these pieces for a broadcast in October, called "The Technocrats" and asked what advice he would give these young musicians. Stockhausen made suggestions to each and they were then invited to respond. All but Plastikman obliged.

Criticism
Robin Maconie finds that, "Compared to the work of his contemporaries, Stockhausen's music has a depth and rational integrity that is quite outstanding... His researches, initially guided by Meyer-Eppler, have a coherence unlike any other composer then or since". Maconie also compares Stockhausen to Beethoven: "If a genius is someone whose ideas survive all attempts at explanation, then by that definition Stockhausen is the nearest thing to Beethoven this century has produced. Reason? His music lasts", and "As Stravinsky said, one never thinks of Beethoven as a superb orchestrator because the quality of invention transcends mere craftsmanship. It is the same with Stockhausen: the intensity of imagination gives rise to musical impressions of an elemental and seemingly unfathomable beauty, arising from necessity rather than conscious design".

Christopher Ballantine, comparing the categories of experimental and avant-garde music, concludes that Perhaps more than any other contemporary composer, Stockhausen exists at the point where the dialectic between experimental and avant-garde music becomes manifest; it is in him, more obviously than anywhere else, that these diverse approaches converge. This alone would seem to suggest his remarkable significance.

Igor Stravinsky expressed great, but not uncritical, enthusiasm for Stockhausen's music in the conversation books with Robert Craft, and for years organised private listening sessions with friends in his home where he played tapes of Stockhausen's latest works. In an interview published in March 1968, however, he says of an unidentified person, I have been listening all week to the piano music of a composer now greatly esteemed for his ability to stay an hour or so ahead of his time, but I find the alternation of note-clumps and silences of which it consists more monotonous than the foursquares of the dullest eighteenth-century music. The following October, a report in Sovetskaia Muzyka translated this sentence (and a few others from the same article) into Russian, substituting for the conjunction "but" the phrase "Ia imeiu v vidu Karlkheintsa Shtokkhauzena" ("I am referring to Karlheinz Stockhausen"). When this translation was quoted in Druskin's Stravinsky biography, the field was widened to all of Stockhausen's compositions and Druskin adds for good measure, "indeed, works he calls unnecessary, useless and uninteresting", again quoting from the same Sovetskaia Muzyka article, even though it had made plain that the characterization was of American "university composers".

Controversy
Throughout his career, Stockhausen excited controversy. One reason for this is that his music displays high expectations about "shaping and transforming the world, about the truth of life and of reality, about the creative departure into a future determined by spirit", so that Stockhausen's work "like no other in the history of new music, has a polarizing effect, arouses passion, and provokes drastic opposition, even hatred". Another reason was acknowledged by Stockhausen himself in a reply to a question during an interview on the Bavarian Radio on 4 September 1960, reprinted as a foreword to his first collection of writings: 
After the student revolts in 1968, musical life in Germany became highly politicized, and Stockhausen found himself a target for criticism, especially from the leftist camp who wanted music "in the service of the class struggle". Cornelius Cardew and Konrad Boehmer denounced their former teacher as a "servant of capitalism". In a climate where music mattered less than political ideology, some critics held that Stockhausen was too élitist, while others complained he was too mystical.

Scandal at the Fresco premiere

As reported in the German magazine Der Spiegel, the première (and only performance to date) on 15 November 1969 of Stockhausen's work Fresco for four orchestral groups (playing in four different locations) was the scene of a scandal. The rehearsals were already marked by objections from the orchestral musicians questioning such directions as "glissandos no faster than one octave per minute" and others phoning the artists' union to clarify whether they really had to perform the Stockhausen work as part of the orchestra. In the backstage warm-up room at the premiere a hand-lettered sign could be seen saying: "We're playing, otherwise we would be fired". During the première the parts on some music stands suddenly were replaced by placards reading things like "Stockhausen-Zoo. Please don't feed", that someone had planted. Some musicians, fed up with the monkeyshines, left after an hour, though the performance was planned for four to five hours. Stockhausen fans protested, while Stockhausen foes were needling the musicians asking: "How can you possibly participate in such crap?" ("Wie könnt ihr bloß so eine Scheiße machen!"). At one point someone managed to switch off the stand lights, leaving the musicians in the dark. After 260 minutes the performance ended with no-one participating any longer.

Sirius star system
In an obituary in the German newspaper Die Zeit, Karlheinz Stockhausen was quoted as having said: "I was educated at Sirius and want to return to there, although I am still living in Kürten near Cologne." On hearing about this, conductor Michael Gielen stated: "When he said he knew what was happening at Sirius, I turned away from him in horror. I haven't listened to a note since." He called Stockhausen's statements "hubris" and "nonsense", while at the same time defending his own belief in astrology: "Why should these large celestial bodies exist if they do not stand for something? I cannot imagine that there is anything senseless in the universe. There is much we do not understand".

11 September attacks
In a press conference in Hamburg on 16 September 2001, Stockhausen was asked by a journalist whether the characters in Licht were for him "merely some figures out of a common cultural history" or rather "material appearances". Stockhausen replied, "I pray daily to Michael, but not to Lucifer. I have renounced him. But he is very much present, like in New York recently." The same journalist then asked how the events of 11 September had affected him, and how he viewed reports of the attack in connection with the harmony of humanity represented in Hymnen. He answered:Well, what happened there is, of course—now all of you must adjust your brains—the biggest work of art there has ever been. The fact that spirits achieve with one act something which we in music could never dream of, that people practise ten years madly, fanatically for a concert. And then die. [Hesitantly.] And that is the greatest work of art that exists for the whole Cosmos. Just imagine what happened there. There are people who are so concentrated on this single performance, and then five thousand people are driven to Resurrection. In one moment. I couldn't do that. Compared to that, we are nothing, as composers. [...] It is a crime, you know of course, because the people did not agree to it. They did not come to the "concert". That is obvious. And nobody had told them: "You could be killed in the process."

As a result of the reaction to the press report of Stockhausen's comments, a four-day festival of his work in Hamburg was cancelled. In addition, his pianist daughter announced to the press that she would no longer appear under the name "Stockhausen". In a subsequent message, he stated that the press had published "false, defamatory reports" about his comments, and said:

At the press conference in Hamburg, I was asked if Michael, Eve and Lucifer were historical figures of the past and I answered that they exist now, for example Lucifer in New York. In my work, I have defined Lucifer as the cosmic spirit of rebellion, of anarchy. He uses his high degree of intelligence to destroy creation. He does not know love. After further questions about the events in America, I said that such a plan appeared to be Lucifer's greatest work of art. Of course I used the designation "work of art" to mean the work of destruction personified in Lucifer. In the context of my other comments this was unequivocal.

Honours

Amongst the numerous honours and distinctions that were bestowed upon Stockhausen are:
 1964 German gramophone critics award;
 1966 and 1972 SIMC award for orchestral works (Italy);
 1968 Grand Art Prize for Music of the State of North Rhine-Westphalia; Grand Prix du Disque (France); Member of the Free Academy of the Arts, Hamburg;
 1968, 1969, and 1971 Edison Prize (Netherlands);
 1970 Member of the Royal Swedish Academy of Music;
 1973 Member of the Academy of Arts, Berlin;
 1974 Federal Cross of Merit, 1st class (Germany);
 1977 Member of the Philharmonic Academy of Rome;
 1979 Honorary Member of the American Academy and Institute of Arts and Letters;
 1981 Prize of the Italian music critics for Donnerstag aus Licht;
 1982 German gramophone prize (German Phonograph Academy);
 1983 Diapason d'or (France) for Donnerstag aus Licht;
 1985 Commandeur de l'Ordre des Arts et des Lettres (France);
 1986 Ernst von Siemens Music Prize;
 1987 Honorary Member of the Royal Academy of Music, London;
 1988 Honorary Citizen of the Kuerten community;
 1989 Honorary Member of the American Academy of Arts and Sciences;
 1990 Prix Ars Electronica, Linz, Austria;
 1991 Honorary Fellow of the Royal Irish Academy of Music; Accademico Onorario of the Accademia Nazionale di Santa Caecilia, Rome; Honorary Patron of Sound Projects Weimar;
 1992 IMC-UNESCO Picasso Medal; Distinguished Service Medal of the German state North Rhine-Westphalia; German Music Publishers Society Award for the score of Luzifers Tanz (3rd scene of Saturday from Light);
 1993 Patron of the European Flute Festival; Diapason d'or for Klavierstücke I–XI and Mikrophonie I and II;
 1994 German Music Publishers Society Award for the score Jahreslauf (Act 1 of Tuesday from Light);
 1995 Honorary Member of the German Society for Electro-Acoustic Music; Bach Award of the city of Hamburg;
 1996 Honorary doctorate (Dr. phil. h. c.) of the Free University of Berlin; Composer of the European Cultural Capital Copenhagen; Edison Prize (Netherlands) for Mantra; Member of the Free Academy of the Arts Leipzig; Honorary Member of the Leipzig Opera; Cologne Culture Prize;
 1997 German Music Publishers Society Award for the score of Weltparlament (first scene of Wednesday from Light); Honorary member of the music ensemble LIM (Laboratorio de Interpretación Musical), Madrid;
 1999 Entry in the Golden Book of the city of Cologne;
 2000 German Music Publishers Society Award for the score of Evas Erstgeburt (act 1 of Monday from Light);
 2000–2001 The film In Absentia made by the Quay Brothers (England) to concrete and electronic music by Karlheinz Stockhausen won the Golden Dove (first prize) at the International Festival for Animated Film in Leipzig. More awards: Special Jury Mention, Montreal, FCMM 2000; Special Jury Award, Tampere 2000; Special Mention, Golden Prague Awards 2001; Honorary Diploma Award, Cracow 2001; Best Animated Short Film, 50th Melbourne International Film Festival 2001; Grand Prix, Turku Finland 2001;
 2001 German Music Publishers Society Award for the score Helicopter String Quartet (third scene of Wednesday from Light); Polar Music Prize of the Royal Swedish Academy of the Arts;
 2002 Honorary Patron of the Sonic Arts Network, England;
 2003 German Music Publishers Society Award for the score of Michaelion (4th scene of Wednesday from Light);
 2004 Associated member of the Academie Royale des Sciences, des Lettres & des Beaux-arts (Belgium); Honorary doctorate (Dr. phil. h. c.) of the Queen's University in Belfast; German Music Publishers Society Award for the score of Stop and Start for 6 instrumental groups;
 2005 German Music Publishers Society Award for the score of Hoch-Zeiten for choir (fifth scene of Sunday from Light);
 2006 Honorary member of the Accademia Filarmonica di Bologna;
 2008 On 22 August, Stockhausen's birthday, the Rathausplatz in his home town of Kürten was renamed Karlheinz-Stockhausen-Platz in his honour;
 2008 On 10 October, the Studio for Electronic Music of the Royal Conservatory of The Hague in the Netherlands changed its name to Karlheinz Stockhausen Studio;
 2009 German Music Publishers Society Award for the score of Momente for solo soprano, four choral groups, and 13 instrumentalists;
 2010 The municipality of Kürten adopts the designation "Stockhausengemeinde" (Stockhausen municipality) in honour of the late composer.

Notable students

References

Citations

Sources

 
 
 

 
 
 
 
 
 
 
 
 
 
 
 
 

 
 
 
 
 
 
 
 
 
 

 
 
 
 
 
 
 
 
 
 
 Davies, Hugh. 1968. "Working with Stockhausen." The Composer no. 27:8–11.
 
 
 
 
 
 
 

 
 
 
 
 
 
 
 
 
 
 
 
  via Newspapers.com

Further reading

 Adamenko, Victoria. 2007. Neo-mythologism in Music: From Scriabin and Schoenberg to Schnittke and Crumb. Interplay Series 5. Hillsdale, New York: Pendragon Press. .
 Anon. 2008. "Karlheinz Stockhausen—a Romantic Discovering the Universe" [radio transcript]. In Talking to Kinky and Karlheinz—170 musicians get vocal on The Music Show, edited by Anni Heino, 283–291. Sydney: ABC Books. .
 Assis, Gustavo Oliveira Alfaix. 2011. Em busca do som: A música de Karlheinz Stockhausen nos anos 1950. São Paulo: Editora UNESP. .
 Barrett, Richard. 2012. "Stockhausen Today and Tomorrow". Revised version of a paper presented at the Festival of Light, University of Birmingham/Birmingham Conservatoire/mac Birmingham (20 August). Richardbarrettmusic.com (Accessed 11 September 2012).
 Bauer, Christian. 2008. Sacrificium intellectus: Das Opfer des Verstandes in der Kunst von Karlheinz Stockhausen, Botho Strauß und Anselm Kiefer. Munich: Wilhelm Fink Verlag. .
 Bauermeister, Mary. 2011. Ich hänge im Triolengitter: Mein Leben mit Karlheinz Stockhausen. Munich: Edition Elke Heidenreich bei C. Bertelsmann. .
 Beaucage, Réjean. 2005. "Contact avec / Contact with Stockhausen", English translation by Jane Brierley. La Scena Musicale 11, no. 3 (November): 18–25.
 Beer, Roland de. 2008. "Magistraal klinkend in memoriam". De Volkskrant (21 June).
Betsill, Daniel Joseph. 2007. The Construction of Stockhausen's Heaven's Door.
 Blumröder, Christoph von. 1993. Die Grundlegung der Musik Karlheinz Stockhausens. Supplement to the Archiv für Musikwissenschaft 32, ed. Hans Heinrich Eggebrecht. Stuttgart: Franz Steiner Verlag.
Blumröder, Christoph von. 2017. Die elektroakustische Musik: Eine kompositorische Revolution und ihre Folgen. Signale aus Köln: Beiträge zur Musik der Zeit 22. Vienna; Verlag Der Apfel. .
Bos, Christian. 2007. "Synthesizer sind etwas Sinnliches", Kölner Stadt-Anzeiger (28 November; accessed 5 April 2017).
 Bridoux-Michel, Séverine. 2006. "Architecture et musique: croisements de pensées après 1950 (la collaboration de l'architecte et du musicien, de la conception à l'oeuvre)". PhD diss., l'Université Charles de Gaulle–Lille.
 Brümmer, Ludger. 2008. "Stockhausen on Electronics, 2004". Computer Music Journal 32, no. 4:10–16.
 Cardew, Cornelius. 1974. Stockhausen Serves Imperialism. London: Latimer New Directions. Reprinted in Cornelius Cardew (1936–1981) – A Reader, edited by E Prévost. Harlow: Copula, 2006.
 Chaplygina, Marina. 1993. Карлхайнц Штокхаузен: когда-нибудь речь станет пением ["Karlheinz Stockhausen: Some Day Speech Will Become Singing" (interview)]. Музыкальная жизнь [Musical Life], nos. 15–16:24–26.
 Côté, Michel F. 2009. "Considérations en provenance de Sirius". Circuit: Musiques Contemporaines 19, no. 2:57–62.
Covell, Grant Chu. 2000. "Stockhausen Is Invisible ". La Folia 3/1 (November).
Covell, Grant Chu. 2007. "Ferneyhough & Stockhausen: Grubby and Gruppen ". La Folia (April).
 Custodis, Michael. 2004. Die soziale Isolation der neuen Musik: Zum Kölner Musikleben nach 1945. Supplement to the Archiv für Musikwissenschaft 54, edited by Albrecht Riethmüller, with Reinhold Brinkmann, Ludwig Finscher, Hans-Joachim Hinrichsen, Wolfgang Osthoff, and Wolfram Steinbeck. Stuttgart: Franz Steiner Verlag. .
 Dirmeikis, Paul. 1999. Le Souffle du temps: Quodlibet pour Karlheinz Stockhausen. [La Seyne-sur-Mer]: Éditions Telo Martius. 
Dousson, Lambert. 2020. « La plus grande œuvre d'art pour le cosmos tout entier ». Stockhausen et le 11 septembre (Essai sur la musique et la violence), Paris, éditions MF, coll. « Répercussions », 2020, 240 p.
Essl, Karlheinz. 1989. "Aspekte des Seriellen bei Karlheinz Stockhausen". First appeared in Lothar Knessl (Ed.) WIEN MODERN '89: 90–97. Vienna.
 Feß, Eike. 2004. "Die Wirkung der Informationstheorie auf das Werk Karlheinz Stockhausens". In Kompositorische Stationen des 20. Jahrhunderts. Debussy, Webern, Messiaen, Boulez, Cage, Ligeti, Stockhausen, Höller, Bayle. Signale aus Köln. Beiträge zur Musik der Zeit 7, edited by Christoph von Blumröder, 116–128. Münster: Lit-Verlag, 2004. .
Föllmer, Golo. [n.d.] "Karlheinz Stockhausen: "Spherical Concert Hall"" (Osaka World Expo, 1970). Medien Kunst Net / Media Art Net.
Fox, Edward. 1993. "Licht Fantastic". The Age, Melbourne (9 October): 173. via Newspapers.com
 Frisius, Rudolf. 1996. Karlheinz Stockhausen I: Einführung in das Gesamtwerk; Gespräche mit Karlheinz Stockhausen. Mainz: Schott Musik International. .
 Frisius, Rudolf. 2008. Karlheinz Stockhausen II: Die Werke 1950–1977; Gespräch mit Karlheinz Stockhausen, "Es geht aufwärts". Mainz, London, Berlin, Madrid, New York, Paris, Prague, Tokyo, Toronto: Schott Musik International. .
 Frisius, Rudolf. 2013. Karlheinz Stockhausen III: Die Werkzyklen 1977–2007. Mainz, London, Berlin, Madrid, New York, Paris, Prague, Tokyo, Toronto: Schott Music. .
 Fritsch, Johannes, with Richard Toop. 2008. "Versuch, eine Grenze zu überschreiten ... Johannes Fritsch im Gespräch über die Aufführungspraxis von Werken Karlheinz Stockhausens". MusikTexte: Zeitschrift für neue Musik, no. 116 (February): 31–40.
Hattenstone, Simon. 2001. "Listen without Prejudice". The Guardian, London (6 October): 62. via Newspapers.com
 Gather, John Philipp. 2003. "The Origins of Synthetic Timbre Serialism and the Parisian Confluence, 1949–52". PhD diss. Buffalo: State University of New York, Buffalo.
 Gilmore, Bob. 2009. "Claude Vivier and Karlheinz Stockhausen: Moments from a Double Portrait". Circuit: musiques contemporaines 19, no. 2:35–49.
 Grant, M[orag] J[osephine], and Imke Misch (eds.). 2016. The Musical Legacy of Karlheinz Stockhausen: Looking Back and Forward. Hofheim: Wolke Verlag. .
 Grohmann, Katerina. 2010. Karlheinz Stockhausen: Oper MITTWOCH aus LICHT. Kölner Beiträge zur Musikwissenschaft 12, edited by Christoph von Blumröder, Wolfram Steinbeck. Kassel: Bosse Verlag. .
 Gutkin, David. 2012. "Drastic or Plastic? Threads from Karlheinz Stockhausen's 'Musik und Graphik', 1959". Perspectives of New Music 50, nos. 1 & 2 (Winter–Summer): 255–305. 
 Habib, André. 15 January 2002. "Through a Glass Darkly: Interview with the Quay Brothers". Senses of Cinema (February) (archive from 18 May 2011; accessed 18 March 2016). French translation previously published in the Montreal-based online journal Hors Champ.
 Hänggi, Christian. 2011. Stockhausen at Ground Zero. Fillip. .
 Hartwell, Robin. 2012. "Threats and Promises: Lucifer, Hell, and Stockhausen's Sunday from Light". Perspectives of New Music 50, nos. 1 & 2 (Winter–Summer): 393–424.
 Heikinheimo, Seppo. 1972. The Electronic Music of Karlheinz Stockhausen: Studies on the Esthetical and Formal Problems of Its First Phase, translated by Brad Absetz. Acta Musicologica Fennica 6. Helsinki: Suomen Musiikkitieteellinen Seura / Musikvetenskapliga Sällskapet i Finland. (Doctoral thesis, Helsinki University.)
 Henkel, Georg. 2012. Kosmisches Lachen: Synthi-Fou und der närrische Humor in Karlheinz Stockhausens Opernzyklus Licht. Hamburg: Tredition GmbH. .
 Harvey, Jonathan. 1975a. The Music of Stockhausen: An Introduction. Berkeley and Los Angeles: University of California Press. .
 Heyworth, Peter. 1971. "Composer-Prophet". The Observer, London (25 April): 9. via Newspapers.com
 Heyworth, Peter. 1985. "Alchemist of the avant-garde" and "Thursday's child goes far". The Observer, London (22 September): 9, 23. via Newspapers.com
 Holbein, Ulrich. 2008. "Karlheinz Stockhausen: Elektroniker, Neutöner, Klang-Avantgardist, Lichtgestalt, Mythenverdünner". In his Narratorium: 255 Lebensbilder, 916–920. Zürich: Ammann Verlag. .
 Hollings, Ken. May 1999. " Lost in the Stars: Karlheinz Stockhausen in Conversation with Ken Hollings, Kürten, Germany, 12 March 1999". The Wire, no. 184.
 Hopp, Winrich. 1998. Kurzwellen von Karlheinz Stockhausen: Konzeption und musikalische Poiesis. Kölner Schriften zur neuen Musik 6. With CD recording. Mainz and New York: Schott. .
 Howland, Patricia L. 2010. "Formal Processes in Post-Tonal Music: A Study of Selected Works by Babbitt, Stockhausen, and Carter". PhD diss. New York: City University of New York.
Schonberg, Harlold C.. 1971. "Stockhausen Does the Twist". The Baltimore Sun (7 March): 96. via Newspapers.com
 Ingram, James, and Paul Roberts. 2008. "Über das Unsichtbarsein: Ein E-mail Interview mit James Ingram zu seiner Tätigkeit als Stockhausens Notenkopist", translated by Gisela Gronemeyer. MusikTexte, no. 117 (May): 43–52. Expanded English text, as "On Being Invisible" (April 2009). James Ingram: Act Two website. Accessed 27 July 2010.
 Jones, Stephen. 2004. "Philippa Cullen: Dancing the Music". Leonardo Music Journal 14 (Composers Inside Electronics: Music After David Tudor): 64–73.
 . 2005. "Eötvös und Stockhausen". In Identitäten: Der Komponist und Dirigent Peter Eötvös: Symposion, 19. September 2004, Alte Oper Frankfurt am Main, edited by Hans-Klaus Jungheinrich, 48–56. Edition Neue Zeitschrift für Musik. Mainz: Schott Musik International. .
 Kelsall, John. 1975. "Compositional Techniques in the Music of Stockhausen (1951–1970)". PhD diss. Glasgow: University of Glasgow.
 Kirchmeyer, Helmut. 2009. "Stockhausens Elektronische Messe nebst einem Vorspann unveröffentlichter Briefe aus seiner Pariser Zeit an Herbert Eimert". Archiv für Musikwissenschaft 66, no. 3:234–359.
 Kohl, Jerome. 2008. Programme notes in the programme booklet for the Klang Festival, (1–9 November), Southbank Centre, London: 12–13, 16–17, 20–21, 24–25.
 Kohl, Jerome. 2009a. "Klang/Som: Die 24 Stunden des Tages/As 24 horas do dia". Temporada Gulbenkian de Música 2009–2010 (October): 13–14.
 Kohl, Jerome. 2009b. "Hoffnung/Esperança, para violino, viola e violoncelo (2007): 9ª hora de Klang, as 24 horas do dia". Temporada Gulbenkian de Música 2009–2010 (October): 18.
 Kohl, Jerome. 2009c. "Schönheit/Beleza, para clarinete baixo, flauta e trompete (2006): 6ª hora de Klang, as 24 horas do dia". Temporada Gulbenkian de Música 2009–2010 (October): 22.
 Kohl, Jerome. 2010. "A Child of the Radio Age". In Cut & Splice: Transmission, edited by Daniela Cascella and Lucia Farinati, 135–139. London: Sound and Music. .
 Kohl, Jerome. 2012a. "A Gedenkschrift for Karlheinz Stockhausen: Guest Editor's Introduction". Perspectives of New Music 50, nos. 1 & 2 (Winter–Summer): 306–312.
 Kohl, Jerome. 2012b. "Harmonies and the Path from Beauty to Awakening: Hours 5 to 12 of Stockhausen's Klang". Perspectives of New Music 50, nos. 1 & 2 (Winter–Summer): 476–523.
 Krause, Peter. 2008. "Elektro-Esoterik: Uraufführung von Stockhausen-Klang". Die Welt (8 August).
 Maconie, Robin. 2016. Other Planets: The Complete Works of Karlheinz Stockhausen 1950–2007, updated edition. Lanham, Maryland, and London: Rowman & Littlefield. .
 Mießgang, Thomas, and Robert Baumanns. 1997. "Schlagsahne, Irrengesang, Kirmesgeister: Karlheinz Stockhausen testet Krautrock". Die Zeit, 1997, no. 17 (18 April).
 Miller, Paul. 2009. "Stockhausen and the Serial Shaping of Space". PhD diss. Rochester: Eastman School of Music.
 Miller, Paul. 2012. "An Adventure into Outer Space: Stockhausen's Lichter—Wasser and the Analysis of Spatialized Music". Perspectives of New Music 50, nos. 1 & 2 (Winter–Summer): 342–392.
 Misch, Imke, and Markus Bandur (eds.). 2001. Karlheinz Stockhausen bei den Internationalen Ferienkursen für Neue Musik in Darmstadt 1951–1996: Dokumente und Briefe. Kürten: Stockhausen-Verlag. .
 Mischke, Joachim. 8 August 2008. "SHMF: Neue Musik, visionär, von heute und wie von gestern". Hamburger Abendblatt.
 Morreau, Annette. 6 March 2001. "Where Herzog Met Portishead: Only Connect, Barbican, London". The Independent.
 Mowitz, Michael. 2010. Die Form der Klänge. Stockhausens ›Konzeption einer einheitlichen musikalischen Zeit‹ am Beispiel der Komposition "Kontakte". Osnabrück: epOs-Music. .
 Normandeau, Robert. 2009. "Influence de Stockhausen chez les compositeurs électroacoustiques québécois: Sondage courriel et entrevues". Circuit: Musiques Contemporaines 19, no. 2:51–55.
 Parsons, Ian Lawrence. 2019. "The Phenomenology of Light: an Interpretation of Stockhausen's Opera Cycle Drawing on Heidegger's Fourfold and Lacanian Psychoanalysis". PhD diss. Melbourne: Monash University.
 Rea, John. 2009. "On Stockhausen's Kontakte (1959–60) for Tape, Piano and Percussion: A Lecture/Analysis by John Rea Given at the University of Toronto, March 1968". Circuit: Musiques Contemporaines 19, no. 2:77–86.
 Rigoni, Michel. 1998. Stockhausen: ... un vaisseau lancé vers le ciel, second edition, revised, corrected, and enlarged. Lillebonne: Millénaire III Editions. .
 Rigoni, Michel. 2001. Le rêve de Lucifer de Karlheinz Stockhausen. La trace des silences. [Paris]: M. de Maule. .
 Roads, Curtis. 2001. Microsound. Cambridge: MIT Press. .
 Romney, Jonathan. 3 March 2001. "The Barbican's Musical Jellyfish: Sound on Film Live". The Guardian.
 Rudi, Jøran (editor), Asbjørn Blokkum Flø, and Asbjørn Schaathun. 2008. Karlheinz Stockhausen – A Pioneer in Utopia. Oslo: Notam. .
 Sandner, Wolfgang, and Péter Eötvös. 2005. "Klangbildeaufnahmen wie von einem Fotografen". In Identitäten: Der Komponist und Dirigent Péter Eötvös: Symposion, 19. September 2004, Alte Oper Frankfurt am Main, edited by Hans-Klaus Jungheinrich, 59–67. Edition Neue Zeitschrift für Musik. Mainz: Schott Musik International. .
 Shimizu, Minoru. 1999. "Stockhausen und Japan, Licht und Schatten". In Internationales Stockhausen-Symposion 1998: Musikwissenschaftliches Institut der Universität zu Köln, 11. bis 14. November 1998. Tagungsbericht, edited by Imke Misch and Christoph von Blumröder, 87–94. Signale aus Köln: Beiträge zur Musik der Zeit 4. Saarbrücken: PFAU-Verlag. .
 Sigel, Paul. 2000. "Der deutsche Beitrag auf der Expo70 in Osaka." Arch plus no. 149–150 (April): 116–133. Reprinted online Thema 5, no. 1 (July 2000).
 Smalley, John. 2000."Gesang der Jünglinge: History and Analysis". Programme note for concert series, Masterpieces of 20th-Century Electronic Music: A Multimedia Perspective. The Columbia University Computer Music Center, presented by Lincoln Center (July) .
 Stenzl, Jürg. 1991. "York Höller's 'The Master and Margarita': A German Opera." Translated by Sue Rose. Tempo New Series, no. 179 (December): 8–15.
 Stephens, Suzanne, and Kathinka Pasveer (eds.). 2008. Gedenkschrift für Stockhausen. Kürten: Stockhausen-Stiftung für Musik. .
 Stockhausen, Karlheinz. 1998. "Bildung ist große Arbeit: Karlheinz Stockhausen im Gespräch mit Studierenden des Musikwissenschaftlichen Instituts der Universität zu Köln am 5. Februar 1997." In Stockhausen 70: Das Programmbuch Köln 1998. Signale aus Köln: Musik der Zeit 1, edited by Imke Misch and Christoph von Blumröder, 1–36. Saarbrücken: Pfau-Verlag.
 Stockhausen, Karlheinz. 2007b. "Harmonien/Harmonies for Bass Clarinet (2006)". In 2007 Stockhausen-Kurse Kürten: Programm zu den Interpretations- und Kompositionskursen und Konzerten der Musik von / Programme for the Interpretation and Composition Courses and Concerts of the Music of Karlheinz Stockhausen, 7. Juli bis 15. Juli 2007 in Kürten / from th to 15th 2007 in Kuerten, notes for the German première on 11 July 2007, pp. 33–34. Kürten: Stockhausen-Verlag.
 Stockhausen, Karlheinz. 2007c. "Harmonien/Harmonies for Flute (2006): 5th Hour of Klang / Sound, The 24 Hours of the Day". In 2007 Stockhausen-Kurse Kürten: Programm zu den Interpretations- und Kompositionskursen und Konzerten der Musik von / Programme for the Interpretation and Composition Courses and Concerts of the Music of Karlheinz Stockhausen, 7. Juli bis 15. Kürten: Stockhausen-Verlag.
 Stockhausen, Karlheinz. 2012. Jahreskreis—Circle of the Year: Immerwährender Kalendar mit Stockhausen-Zitaten und -Abbildungen / Perpetual Calendar with Stockhausen Quotes and Illustrations, edited by Kathinka Pasveer, translations by Suzanne Stephens, Jayne Obst, Tim Nevill, Jerome Kohl, Thomas von Steinaecker, and Imke Misch. Kürten: Stockhausen-Verlag. .
 Stockhausen, Karlheinz, and Maryvonne Kendergi. 2009. "La mesure du temps: un entretien inédit avec Stockhausen (1958)". Circuit: Musiques Contemporaines 19, no. 2:63–76.
 Stockhausen-Stiftung. 2008. Stockhausen Aufführungen/Performances 2008. Kürten: Stockhausen-Stiftung.
 Straus, Joseph N. 1997. "Babbitt and Stravinsky under the Serial 'Regime'" Perspectives of New Music 35, no. 2 (Summer): 17–32.
 Straus, Joseph N. 2001. Stravinsky's Late Music. Cambridge Studies in Music Theory and Analysis 16. New York: Cambridge University Press 33–35. .
 Stravinsky, Igor, and Robert Craft. 1960. Memories and Commentaries. Berkeley and Los Angeles: University of California Press.
 Telford, James. 2011. "Reconciling Opposing Forces: The Young James Macmillan—A Performance History". Tempo 65, no. 257 (July): 40–51.
 Tommasini, Anthony. 30 September 2001. "The Devil Made Him Do It". The New York Times.
 Tilbury, John. 2008. Cornelius Cardew (1936–1981) – A Life Unfinished. Harlow: Copula.
 Toop, Richard. 2008. "Kulturelle Dissidenten: Die Stockhausen-Klasse der Jahre 1973 und 1974". MusikTexte: Zeitschrift für neue Musik, no. 116 (February): 46–49.
 Toop, Richard. 2012. "Himmels-Tür: Crossing to the Other Side". Perspectives of New Music 50, nos. 1 & 2 (Winter–Summer): 425–475.
 Truelove, Stephen. 1984. "Karlheinz Stockhausen's Klavierstück XI: An Analysis of Its Composition via a Matrix System of Serial Polyphony and the Translation of Rhythm into Pitch." DMA diss. Norman: University of Oklahoma.
 Truelove, Stephen. 1998. "The Translation of Rhythm into Pitch in Stockhausen's Klavierstück XI." Perspectives of New Music 36, no. 1 (Winter): 189–220.
 Ulrich, Thomas. 2006. Neue Musik aus religiösem Geist: theologisches Denken im Werk von Karlheinz Stockhausen und John Cage. Saarbrücken: Pfau. .
 Ulrich, Thomas. 2012a. "Lucifer and Morality in Stockhausen's Opera Cycle Licht", translated by Jerome Kohl. Perspectives of New Music 50, nos. 1 & 2 (Winter–Summer): 313–341.
 Ulrich, Thomas. 2012b. Stockhausen: A Theological Interpretation, translated by Jayne Obst. Kürten: Stockhausen-Stiftung für Musik. .
 Ulrich, Thomas. 2017. Stockhausens Zyklus LICHT: Ein Opernführer. Cologne, Weimar, and Vienna: Böhlau Verlag. .
 Vermeil, Jean. 1996. Conversations with Boulez: Thoughts on Conducting, translated by Camille Nash, with a selection of programs conducted by Boulez and a discography by Paul Griffiths. Portland, Oregon: Amadeus Press.
 Viel, Massimiliano. 1990. "Formeltechnik, ponte tra intuito e memoria. Incontro con K.Stockhausen". Sonus 2, no 1: 51–68.
 Voermans, Erik. 2008. "Besluit van een machtig oeuvre". Het Parool (20 June).
 Wager, Gregg. 1998. Symbolism as a Compositional Method in the Works of Karlheinz Stockhausen. College Park, Maryland: Gtrgg Wager. English translation of "Symbolik als kompositorische Methode in den Werken von Karlheinz Stockhausen". PhD diss. Berlin: Free University Berlin, 1996.
 Wolfson, Richard. 5 March 2001. "Hit and mismatch" The Telegraph, London.
 Welsh, Tom. 2019. "Ballad for a Child: The Discovery of an Unknown Song by Karlheinz Stockhausen Provides a Humanising Footnote to His Barnstorming 1958 Lecture Tour of the US". The Wire, no. 425 (July): 20–21.

Obituaries
 Anon. 2007. "Karlheinz Stockhausen: Influential and Controversial German Composer Who Pursued His Uncompromising Avant-Garde Vision through Six Decades". The Times (10 December) (archive from 14 August 2011, accessed 20 May 2020).
 Nonnenmann, Rainer. 2007. "In Kürten zu Hause—und im Universum". Kölner Stadt-Anzeiger (7 December) (in German).
Swed, Mark 2007. "Karlheinz Stockhausen, Avant-Garde Composer; at 79". The Boston Globe (8 December): 67. via Newspapers.com

Documentary films 
Karlheinz Stockhausen: Helicopter String Quartet, documentary, The Netherlands, 1995, 78 min., producer: , director: Frank Scheffer, production: Allegri Film, streaming and DVD: Medici.tv. trailer
 , documentary, Germany, 2009, 56 min., producer and director: Norbert Busè and co-director , production: , broadcast: Arte, ZDF.

External links

 
 
 
 
 Stockhausen – full CD editions
 The Stockhausen Society (International)  – main site
 Stockhausen catalogues of works (Stockhausen Stiftung)
 Stockhausen sound files, Stockhausen films, Stockhausen British lectures at UbuWeb
 Stockhausen  excerpts from sound archives works, musiquecontemporaine.fr

1928 births
2007 deaths
People from Kerpen
20th-century classical composers
21st-century classical composers
People from the Rhine Province
University of Bonn alumni
German male classical composers
German opera composers
Male opera composers
Experimental composers
Members of the Royal Swedish Academy of Music
Honorary Members of the Royal Academy of Music
Microtonal composers
Deutsche Grammophon artists
Twelve-tone and serial composers
Electroacoustic music composers
Ernst von Siemens Music Prize winners
Officers Crosses of the Order of Merit of the Federal Republic of Germany
Commandeurs of the Ordre des Arts et des Lettres
Nonesuch Records artists
Chrysalis Records artists
German electronic musicians
Composers for piano
Composers for pipe organ
Composers for violin
Composers for cello
Composers for trombone
Hochschule für Musik und Tanz Köln alumni
Academic staff of the Hochschule für Musik und Tanz Köln
Pupils of Darius Milhaud
20th-century German composers
21st-century German composers
German Army soldiers of World War II
20th-century German male musicians
Child soldiers in World War II
German magazine founders
Electronic composers